The 2014 Saskatchewan Scotties Tournament of Hearts, the provincial women's curling championship for Saskatchewan, was held from January 8 to 12 at the Tisdale Curling Club in Tisdale. The winning team represented Saskatchewan at the 2014 Scotties Tournament of Hearts in Montreal.

Teams

Round-robin standings
Final round-robin standings

Round-robin results

Draw 1
Wednesday, January 8, 2:00 pm

Draw 2
Wednesday, January 8, 7:30 pm

Draw 3
Thursday, January 9, 9:30 am

Draw 4
Thursday, January 9, 2:00 pm

Draw 5
Thursday, January 9, 7:30 pm

Draw 6
Friday, January 10, 9:30 am

Draw 7
Friday, January 10, 2:00 pm

Draw 8
Saturday, January 11, 9:30 am

Tiebreakers

Round 1
Saturday, January 11, 2:00 pm

Round 2
Saturday, January 11, 7:30 pm

Playoffs

A1 vs. B1
Sunday, January 12, 9:00 am

A2 vs. B2
Sunday, January 12, 9:00 am

Semifinal
Sunday, January 12, 1:00 pm

Final
Sunday, January 12, 5:00 pm

External links
Team line ups and schedule

Curling in Saskatchewan
Saskatchewan
Saskatchewan Scotties Tournament of Hearts